Eoacmaea profunda is a species of sea snail, a true limpet, a marine gastropod mollusk in the family Eoacmaeidae, one of the families of true limpets.

Eoacmaea profunda is the type species in the genus Eoacmaea.

Description
The size of the shell attains 9.8 mm.

Distribution
This species occurs in the Indian Ocean off Madagascar, Aldabra, the Mascarene Basin and Kenya.

References

 Dautzenberg, Ph. (1923). Liste préliminaire des mollusques marins de Madagascar et description de deux espèces nouvelles. J. conchyliol. 68: 21–74 
 Ruwa, R.K. (1984). Invertebrate faunal zonation on rocky shores around Mombasa, Kenya. Kenya Journal of Science and technology Series B 7(2): 41–45
 Nakano T. & Ozawa T. (2007). Worldwide phylogeography of limpets of the order Patellogastropoda: Molecular, morphological and palaeontological evidence. Journal of Molluscan Studies, 73(1): 79–99.

External links
 Deshayes, G. P., 1863 Catalogue des mollusques de l‛Ile de la Réunion (Bourbon). In Maillard, L. (Ed.) Notes sur l'Ile de la Réunion (Bourbon), p. 144 p, 14 pls

Eoacmaeidae
Gastropods described in 1863